The Women's 200 metre backstroke competition of the swimming events at the 2015 World Aquatics Championships was held on 7 August with the heats and 8 August with the final.

Records
Prior to the competition, the existing world and championship records were as follows.

Results

Heats
The heats were held on 7 August at 10:30

Semifinals
The semifinals were held at 17:49.

Semifinal 1

Semifinal 2

Final
The final was held on 8 August at 17:47.

References

Women's 200 metre backstroke
2015 in women's swimming